Indra is the chief deity/god of the Rigveda and the Hindu.

Indra may also refer to:

People
 Indra (given name), a given name found in various cultures

 Indra III (914 – 929), king of the Indian Rashtrakuta dynasty
 Indra IV (973 – 982), king of the Indian Rashtrakuta dynasty
 Indra, Crown Princess of Nepal (1926–1950)
 Indra (singer) (born 1967), Swedish singer and actress

Places
 Indra, Estonia, a village in Vastseliina Parish, Võru County, Estonia
 Indra, Gujarat, a village in Junagadh district, Gujarat state, India
 Indra parish, an administrative unit of Krāslava municipality, Latvia

Technology
 Indra Sistemas, a Spanish information technologies and defense systems company
 Indian Doppler Radar, in use with the Indian armed forces
 Intermeccanica Indra, a sports car developed in 1971 by Intermeccanica, Bitter Cars, and Opel

Film
 Indra (2002 film), Indian Telugu film
 Indra (2008 film), Indian Kannada film

Music
 Indra, a 1903 symphonic poem by Gustav Holst
 "Indra", a song by Thievery Corporation from The Mirror Conspiracy
 "Indra", a song by Susumu Hirasawa from the Sword of the Berserk: Guts' Rage soundtrack

Other uses
 Indra (comics), a Marvel Comics character
 INDRA (naval exercise), a bi-annual military exercise conducted by India and Russia
 Indra, a club owned by Bruno Koschmider, in Hamburg, Germany, where the Beatles played in 1960
Indra Chaudhari, the protagonist of Axiom Verge 2

See also
 
 
 Indira (disambiguation)